Čermná ve Slezsku is a municipality and village in Opava District in the Moravian-Silesian Region of the Czech Republic. It has about 400 inhabitants.

History
The first written mention of Čermná ve Slezsku is from 1377. The village was founded in the 14th century.

Gallery

References

Villages in Opava District